The John Lewis Piano is an album by pianist and composer John Lewis recorded for the Atlantic label.

Reception

Allmusic awarded the album 3 stars stating it contains "introverted interpretations" of "thoughtful and introspective selections".

Track listing
All compositions by John Lewis except as indicated
 "Harlequin" - 5:14
 "Little Girl Blue" (Richard Rodgers, Lorenz Hart) - 4:30
 "The Bad and the Beautiful" (David Raksin) - 4:16
 "D and E" - 4:19
 "It Never Entered My Mind" (Rodgers, Hart) - 3:36
 "Warmeland" (Traditional) - 4:41
 "Two Lyric Pieces: a) Pierrot, b) Colombine" - 10:58

Personnel 
John Lewis - piano
Barry Galbraith (tracks 3, 5 & 6), Jim Hall (track 7) - guitar
Percy Heath - bass (tracks 2 & 4)
Connie Kay - drums (tracks 1, 2 & 4)

References 

 

1957 albums
John Lewis (pianist) albums
Albums produced by Nesuhi Ertegun
Atlantic Records albums